Webner is a surname and can refer to:

 Frank E. Webner, 19th century Pony Express rider.
 Frank E. Webner (1865-1940s) was an American consulting cost accountant
 Wolfgang Webner (born 1937), German former volleyball player